Denis Walsh (born 1961) is an Irish former hurler who played as a midfielder at senior level for the Cork county team.

Born in Cloughduv, County Cork, Walsh arrived on the inter-county scene at the age of seventeen when he first linked up with the Cork minor team, before later joining the under-21 and junior sides. He made his senior debut during the 1984 championship. Walsh immediately became a regular member of the starting fifteen and won two Munster medals.

At club level Walsh is a one-time championship medallist with St Finbarr's, after beginning his career with Cloughduv.

Throughout his career Walsh made 6 championship appearances. His retirement came following the conclusion of the 1986 championship.

References

1961 births
Living people
Cloughduv hurlers
St Finbarr's hurlers
Cork inter-county hurlers